Mark Calvert (born September 29, 1956) is a former pitcher in Major League Baseball. He played for the San Francisco Giants.

Calvert attended East Central High School in Tulsa before attending the University of Tulsa and playing baseball.

References

External links

1956 births
Living people
Major League Baseball pitchers
San Francisco Giants players
Baseball players from Oklahoma
Sportspeople from Tulsa, Oklahoma
Fresno Giants players
Maine Guides players
Phoenix Giants players
Shreveport Captains players
Tulsa Golden Hurricane baseball players